The Newport Bridge is a historic cantilevered Warren truss bridge over the White River in Newport, Arkansas. Built in 1930 to carry U.S. Route 67 (US 67), the road it carries is now designated Arkansas Highway 367 (AR 367) after the former highway was relocated. Designed by Ira G. Hedrick, it is one of three such bridges in the state.

The bridge was listed on the National Register of Historic Places in 1990.

See also
Highway 79 Bridge, similar structure over the White River in Clarendon, Arkansas (demolished 2019)
List of bridges documented by the Historic American Engineering Record in Arkansas
List of bridges on the National Register of Historic Places in Arkansas
National Register of Historic Places listings in Jackson County, Arkansas

References

External links

Historic American Engineering Record in Arkansas
Road bridges on the National Register of Historic Places in Arkansas
Bridges completed in 1930
U.S. Route 67
National Register of Historic Places in Jackson County, Arkansas
Cantilever bridges in the United States
Warren truss bridges in the United States
Newport, Arkansas
Transportation in Jackson County, Arkansas
Bridges of the United States Numbered Highway System
1930 establishments in Arkansas
White River (Arkansas–Missouri)